Bagwell is an unincorporated community in Red River County, Texas, United States. Bagwell has a post office with the ZIP code 75412. The population in Bagwell (zip 75412) is 528.
There are 3 people per square mile aka population density. The median age in Bagwell (zip 75412) is 47.4, the US median age is 37.4.
It is home to Bagwell Baptist
Church which has served its community for years.

References

https://www.bestplaces.net/people/zip-code/texas/bagwell/75412

External links
 

Unincorporated communities in Red River County, Texas
Unincorporated communities in Texas